This is a list of holidays in Sierra Leone. National holidays are non-working days only, and employers have to give workers the day off but they do not have to pay them. Businesses are not required to close.

Public holidays

References 

Sierra Leonean culture
Sierra Leone
Sierra Leone